Liancalus genualis is a species of long-legged fly in the family Dolichopodidae. It is the only species in the genus Liancalus known to occur in eastern North America.

References

Hydrophorinae
Articles created by Qbugbot
Insects described in 1861
Taxa named by Hermann Loew